The Gross Furkahorn is a mountain of the Urner Alps, located on the border between the Swiss cantons of Valais and Uri. It lies north of the Furka Pass and east of the Rhone Glacier.

References

External links
 Gross Furkahorn on Hikr

Mountains of the Alps
Alpine three-thousanders
Mountains of Switzerland
Mountains of Valais
Mountains of the canton of Uri
Uri–Valais border